Geissois denhamii is a species of forest trees endemic to the island nation of Vanuatu in the Pacific.

References 

Endemic flora of Vanuatu
Trees of Vanuatu
denhamii
Plants described in 1866